This article is a list of diseases of peanuts (Arachis hypogaea).

Bacterial diseases

Fungal diseases

Nematodes, parasitic

Phytoplasma, Virus and viruslike diseases

Miscellaneous and diseases or disorders

References 

 Common Names of Diseases, The American Phytopathological Society

Peanut